"Ellos" is a song by the Dominican urban artist Ceky Viciny, released on March 11, 2019. A remix version was released on April 19, 2019, featuring Secreto El Famoso Biberon.

Music video 
The video was released on March 11, 2019. The video has about 10 million views on YouTube and was recorded in the Dominican Republic.

Commercial performance 
The song became one of the first songs of the Dominican Urban Movement to have commercial success outside of the Dominican Republic. In Spain, the remix version debuted at 62, becoming Ceky and Secreto's first entry in that chart. Meanwhile, the original version peaked at 15 in Dominican Republic Urban Charts.

Charts

References 

2019 songs
2019 singles
Dominican Republic songs